El León (Spanish for The Lion) is the seventh studio album by the Argentine ska and reggae band Los Fabulosos Cadillacs. Released in 1992, the album combines multiple genres and incorporates Caribbean rhythms as well as salsa, calypso and reggae influences. It is a notable album in the history of Argentine rock. In 2007, the Argentine edition of Rolling Stone ranked it 21 on its list of "The 100 Greatest Albums of National Rock".

"Carnaval Toda La Vida" and "Gitana" are carnival hymns, while "Manuel Santillán, El León" is discernibly a Reggae track, "Siguiendo La Luna" is a ballad, and "El Aguijón" and "Crucero del Amor" contain aspects of reggae and salsa.
Many songs from the album were released as singles, enjoying moderate to great success, such as "Desapariciones", a cover of a song by Panamanian songwriter Rubén Blades. The album was certified Platinum by CAPIF.

Reception
The Allmusic review by Victor W. Valdivia awarded the album 2.5 stars, stating, "El León is a transitional album. Throughout the album, it's clear the Fabulosos Cadillacs are slowly developing their fusion of rock, reggae, and Latin music ... A cover of Ruben Blades' 'Desapariciones', a song about the victims of Argentina's military dictatorship, is the album's most powerful number. The title cut (done in two versions: reggae and salsa) depicts an urban hell in vivid terms."

Track listing
 "Carnaval Toda La Vida" (Lifelong Carnival) (Vicentico) – 6:03
 "Manuel Santillán, El León" (Reggae) (Manuel Santillan, The Lion) (Flavio Cianciarulo) – 3:57
 "Gitana" (Gypsy) (Cianciarulo) – 3:12
 "Siguiendo La Luna" (Following the Moon) (Sergio Rotman) – 4:57
 "Gallo Rojo" (Red Rooster) (Vicentico) – 4:27
 "El Crucero del Amor" (The Cruiser of Love) (Cianciarulo, Rotman) – 4:23
 "Destino de Paria" (Pariah Fate) (Vicentico) – 5:01
 "Arde Buenos Aires" (Buenos Aires is Burning) (Cianciarulo) – 3:14
 "Desapariciones" (Disappearances) (Rubén Blades) – 5:35
 "Venganza" (Revenge) (Cianciarulo) – 5:10
 "Cartas, Flores y un Puñal" (Letters, Flowers and a Knife) (Cianciarulo) – 2:16
 "El Aguijón" (The Sting) (Vicentico) – 4:51
 "Soledad" (Loneliness) (Cianciarulo) – 3:00
 "Manuel Santillán, El León" (Salsa) (Cianciarulo) – 3:23
 "Ríos de Lágrimas" (River of Tears) (Rotman) – 2:54

Contributing Artists 

 Vicentico – vocals
 Flavio Cianciarulo – bass
 Anibal Rigozzi – guitar
 Mario Siperman – keyboard
 Fernando Ricciardi – drums
 Toto Roblat – percussion
 Fernando Albareda – trombone
 Sergio Rotman – alto saxophone
 Daniel Lozano – trumpet & flugelhorn

External links 
 Los Fabulosos Cadillacs Official Web Site
El León at MusicBrainz
[ El León] at Allmusic
El León at Discogs

References 

Los Fabulosos Cadillacs albums
Sony Music Argentina albums
1992 albums